Théophile Cart (March 31, 1855 in Saint-Antoine-de-Breuilh - May 21, 1931 in Paris) was a French Esperantist professor and linguist.

Beginning in 1907, Cart was an editor for Lingvo Internacia.

References

Works cited

 

1855 births
1931 deaths
French Esperantists
Linguists from France
Lycée Henri-IV teachers